Tessa was a novel published by Margit Sandemo in 1997, though it was completed by 1970. She had originally planned to publish it as a serial in a Norwegian weekly magazine, but the editors of magazine abandoned it. The novel went missing for the next 25 years, until Sandemo found a copy in a cupboard in 1995. A short version of the story is used as part of the novel Selv om jeg elsker deg (1986).

Plot
Tessa is the story of Tessa, a sixteen-year-old schoolgirl who has a vivacious imagination but is, in spite of this, a loner. There is a crime or a riddle to solve in that novel, which is typical of Margit Sandemo. The story begins when a burglar makes a wrong phone number. He inadvertently calls Tessa and tells her about his upcoming crime. Tessa plans to check his intentions.

1997 Norwegian novels
Norwegian crime novels
Novels by Margit Sandemo